Allan Gray is a name that may refer to:

 Allan Gray (composer) (1902–1973), Polish-born composer
 Allan Gray (footballer) (born 1943), Scottish footballer
 Allan Gray (investment management company), a South African-based investment management firm
 Allan Gray (investor) (1938–2019), South African investor and founder of Allan Gray Investment Management and the Allan and Gill Gray Foundation

See also
 Alan Grayson (born 1958), United States Representative for Florida's 9th congressional district

Gray, Allan